George J. "Germany" Smith (April 21, 1863 – December 1, 1927) was an American Major League Baseball player from Pittsburgh, Pennsylvania. Primarily a shortstop, Smith played for five teams in 15 seasons.  He made his major league debut for Altoona Mountain City of the Union Association in 1884.  After Altoona's team folded after just 25 games, he jumped to the Cleveland Blues of the National League.  After the 1884 season, Cleveland then sold him, along with six other players, to the Brooklyn Bridegrooms for $4000.

On June 17, 1885, Smith reportedly committed seven errors intentionally when his team decided to punish new pitcher Phenomenal Smith, losing the game 18-5. All 18 runs against the brash left-hander were unearned‚ due to a total of 14 Brooklyn "errors". "Phenomenal" gave himself his nickname before he joined the team‚ saying that he was so good that he did not need his teammates to win. The intentional misplays of his teammates caused club President Lynch to fine the guilty players $500 each‚ but he reluctantly agreed to release "Phenomenal" to ensure team harmony.

A reliable shortstop in the days when a fielding average below .900 could lead the league, Smith did lead the American Association in 1887 with an .886 average. When the AA folded in 1890, Smith and most of his teammates transferred to the National League's new Brooklyn franchise. In 1891, John Montgomery Ward took over as manager and shortstop, effectively ending Smith's career with Brooklyn, so he left and joined the Cincinnati Reds. There he led NL shortstops in assists each year from 1891 to 1894.  Smith later returned in 1897, when Cincinnati and Brooklyn traded shortstops, with Tommy Corcoran moving to the Reds.

Smith's major league career came to an end after the 1898 season, when he played just 51 games for the St. Louis Browns. He moved on to play for the minor league Minneapolis Millers for the 1899 and 1900 seasons.

Smith died at the age of 64 in Altoona, Pennsylvania, from injuries when struck by an automobile, and is interred at Calvary Cemetery in Altoona.

References

External links

1863 births
1927 deaths
19th-century baseball players
Major League Baseball shortstops
Altoona Mountain Citys players
Cleveland Blues (NL) players
Brooklyn Grays players
Brooklyn Bridegrooms players
Cincinnati Reds players
St. Louis Browns (NL) players
Wilmington Quicksteps (minor league) players
Altoona (minor league baseball) players
Minneapolis Millers (baseball) players
Grand Rapids Furniture Makers players
Baseball players from Pittsburgh
Pedestrian road incident deaths
Road incident deaths in Pennsylvania